Manuel Lapeña Rodríguez y Ruiz de Sotillo (fl. 1808–1811), sometimes referred to as Lapeña, was a Spanish military officer who served during the Peninsular War (Guerra de la Independencia Española – the Spanish War of Independence).  He rose through the Spanish army's ranks to become Captain General of Andalusia.  He is primarily known for commanding an Anglo–Spanish expedition from Cádiz, with the intention of raising the siege on that city, which led to the Battle of Barrosa.

Military career 
As a result of having a reputation for incompetence—he had the nickname Doña Manuela (Lady Manuela)—la Peña was an ambitious man with a talent for diplomacy.  Therefore, by 1808, la Peña commanded a large part of the Spanish Army of the Centre, stationed at Cascante.

Battle of Tudela 

On 23 November 1808, the Spanish Army of the Centre, under the command of General Castaños, came under attack from the French III Corps commanded by Marshal Lannes at Tudela. In what became known as the Battle of Tudela, the attacking French forces sought to take advantage of a gap between the Spanish army's wings. Seeking to close the gap, Castaños sent orders to la Peña at Cascante to move to fill the void. La Peña, however, simply ignored his commander's directive. At the time la Peña, along with General Grimarest, could field some 20,000 men against the 9,000 French troops in that area of the field of battle. Rather than march to support the rest of the Spanish army, however, la Peña limited his activities to small-scale skirmishes with the few French troops close by.  Having lost 200 men in these skirmishes, and witnessing the defeat of the rest of the Army of the Centre, la Peña finally retreated towards Borja, bringing the battle to a close.

Army of the Centre 
After Tudela, Castaños was ordered to Aranjuez to take up the presidency of the Junta Central's military advisory committee. As a result, la Peña assumed overall command of the Spanish Army of the Centre which had reformed at Guadalajara.  With this command, la Peña attempted to intervene against Napoleon's assault on Madrid; this attempt was, however, intercepted by Marshal Ney's I Corps and la Peña was forced to retire to Cuenca. Once there, la Peña was replaced by the Duque de Infantado as the commander of the Army of the Centre.

Cádiz 
In December 1810, la Peña succeeded Blake as the Captain General of Andalusia. He had been, however, a supporter of the Cortes; therefore, the new Regency removed him from this position and ordered him to Cádiz, along with his troops. La Peña was then the senior Spanish officer in Cádiz, and took command of the Spanish forces on the Isla de León.

Battle of Barrosa 

In January 1811, a reduction of the French forces besieging Cádiz caused the British and Spanish allies garrisoning the city to launch an expedition in an attempt to raise the siege. Despite having authority, from the British government, to refuse to take part in a joint expedition of which he was not given command, Sir Thomas Graham—the British commander—agreed to cede command of the force to la Peña.

Sailing from Cádiz between 21–24 February 1811, the Anglo-Spanish expedition regrouped at Tarifa on 27 February 1811 and marched towards the besieging French force's rear at Chiclana. A series of night marches, instigated by la Peña, however, resulted in a change of plan and the allied army ended up marching back towards Cádiz. The French commander, Marshal Victor, marched to meet the allied force with 10,000 men from his besieging army. On 5 March, la Peña's vanguard division met a French division straddling the main road to Cádiz and drove them off the road.

Graham's rearguard division, meanwhile, was attacked by two of Victor's divisions. Graham split his force into two brigades; one to face each of the approaching French divisions. In the ensuing battle, Graham's forces beat off the French attacks despite la Peña entrenching his larger force on the isthmus to Cádiz and refusing to aid his British allies. La Peña further refused to pursue the retreating French troops, allowing them to resume the siege on Cádiz. The siege was not lifted until 24 August 1812.

La Peña's actions in this engagement led to his court-martial where he was acquitted but relieved of command.

References

Bibliography 
;

;

;

;

;

;

.

Spanish generals
Spanish commanders of the Napoleonic Wars
People who were court-martialed
Year of birth missing
Year of death missing